EDM or E-DM may refer to:

Music
 Electronic dance music
 Early Day Miners, American band

Science and technology
 Electric dipole moment
 Electrical discharge machining
 Electronic distance measurement
Entry, Descent, and landing demonstrator Module, like the Shiaparelli EDM
See also: Entry, descent and landing (EDL)

Computing
 Educational data mining
 Electronic document management
 Empirical dynamic modeling
 Enterprise data management
 Enterprise data modeling
 Enterprise decision management
 Entity Data Model
 Euclidean distance matrix

Places
 Edmonton, Alberta, Canada
 Edmonds station, Edmonds, Washington, United States
 Edward-Dean Museum & Gardens, Cherry Valley, California, United States

Politics
 Early day motion

Other uses
 Electronic Direct Mail. See Email marketing 
 Department of Essential Drugs and Medicines of the World Health Organization
 Event-driven marketing
 Master of Education (Ed.M.)
 Electricidade de Moçambique, energy company of Mozambique
 Einsatzstaffel der Deutschen Mannschaft, Croatian collaborationist military unit